The men's 200 metres event at the 2001 European Athletics U23 Championships was held in Amsterdam, Netherlands, at Olympisch Stadion on 14 July.

Medalists

Results

Final
14 July
Wind: 0.1 m/s

Heats
14 July
Qualified: first 2 in each heat and 2 best to the Final

Heat 1
Wind: -1.4 m/s

Heat 2
Wind: -0.9 m/s

Heat 3
Wind: -1.0 m/s

Participation
According to an unofficial count, 17 athletes from 12 countries participated in the event.

 (2)
 (1)
 (1)
 (3)
 (1)
 (2)
 (2)
 (1)
 (1)
 (1)
 (1)
 (1)

References

200 metres
200 metres at the European Athletics U23 Championships